Paul Simon Wellens (born 27 February 1980) is an English professional rugby league coach who is the head coach of St Helens in the Betfred Super League and a former professional rugby league footballer. 

A Great Britain and England international , he played his entire career with St Helens, with whom he won several Super League championships and Challenge Cup titles. Wellens also became only the third player to have won the Lance Todd Trophy, Harry Sunderland Trophy and the Man of Steel Award.

Early life
Born in St Helens, Wellens was educated by the De La Salle Christian Brothers, along with his twin sister Claire who as of 2018 is a Drama teacher at De La Salle.

Playing career
Wellens joined the St. Helens ranks and made his Super League début in the 1999's Super League IV. Success quickly followed and Wellens soon secured his place in perhaps St. Helens strongest era. Wellens became renowned for his all round game, excelling particularly at taking catches. A call-up for Great Britain ensued, and he made a handful of appearances before being contentiously left out by then coach David Waite, who felt Wellens' form had dipped during this period. Wellens played for St. Helens from the interchange bench in their 1999 Super League Grand Final victory over Bradford Bulls.

2000s

Wellens played for St Helens at fullback in their 2002 Super League Grand Final victory against Bradford Bulls but was forced to leave the field after just two minutes with a broken cheekbone, which ruled him out of Great Britain's international series against New Zealand the following month. With a point to prove, Wellens became one of Super League's most notable performers and made the number 1 jersey his own at international level whenever Kris Radlinski was injured. His attitude and aptitude to the game earned him a reputation as a model professional. As one of the quieter members of a squad littered with big names and personalities, it was all the more creditable that Wellens earned St Helens player of the season award in 2004 to underline his value at Knowsley Road, establishing himself as one of the fans' favourites. Wellens was selected in the Great Britain team to compete in the end of season 2004 Rugby League Tri-Nations tournament. In the final against Australia he played at fullback in the Lions' 44–4 loss.

In the 2006 season which would see St Helens collect all three major honours at domestic level, Wellens' own form was rewarded with the Rugby League Writers' Association player of the year, Super League players' player of the year and the prestigious Man of Steel Award. Wellens played for St Helens at fullback in their 2006 Challenge Cup Final victory against Huddersfield. He was also awarded the Harry Sunderland Trophy as man of the match against Hull F.C. in 2006's Super League XI Grand Final. As 2006 Super League champions, St Helens faced 2006 NRL Premiers Brisbane Broncos in the 2007 World Club Challenge. Wellens played at fullback in the Saints' 18–14 victory.
 
In 2007 Wellens continued his form, but added another dimension to his game by becoming one of the league's top try scorers. This was highlighted in the Millennium Magic weekend victory against rivals Wigan, in which Wellens scored four tries. He was named in the end of season Super League Dream Team for the third season running. He also became joint winner of the Lance Todd Trophy award in the 2007 Carnegie Challenge Cup Final against the Catalans Dragons at Wembley Stadium, sharing the prize with Leon Pryce. In the 2008 Challenge Cup Final, Wellens retained the Lance Todd Trophy award.

Wellens was selected for the England squad to compete in the 2008 Rugby League World Cup in Australia. In Group A's first match against Papua New Guinea he played at fullback in England's victory.

In January 2009, Wellens played in his own testimonial match against Wakefield Trinity.

He played in the 2009 Super League Grand Final defeat by the Leeds Rhinos at Old Trafford.

2010s
In 2011, Wellens was named joint captain of St. Helens alongside James Graham. He took over as sole captain following Graham's departure to Canterbury Bulldogs.

He played in the 2011 Super League Grand Final defeat by the Leeds Rhinos at Old Trafford.

In 2014, Wellens made history by scoring the 1,000th point in his career. St Helens reached the 2014 Super League Grand Final, and Wellens captained them from fullback in what was a record-equalling 10th grand final appearance. Saints defeated Wigan Warriors 14–6 to win their first Super League title in 8 years, with Wellens lifting the trophy.

Following a failure to recover from a long-standing hip injury, Wellens announced his retirement from playing on 24 June 2015. In total he played 495 times for St Helens, in the process winning 5 Super League titles, 5 Challenge Cup winners medals, two World Club Challenges, the Man of Steel Award, the Lance Todd Trophy, the Harry Sunderland Trophy, and was named in the Super League Dream Team on four occasions.

Coaching career
On 18 February 2023, Wellens coached St Helens to their 13-12 upset victory over Penrith in the 2023 World Club Challenge.

References

External links
Saints Heritage Society profile
(archived by web.archive.org)  Wellens Saints Profile
(archived by web.archive.org) 2001 Ashes profile
(archived by web.archive.org) Wonderful Wellens Strikes Four Again
Wellens Wins Man of Steel Award
Wellens Wins England Call Up
 

1980 births
Living people
English rugby league players
England national rugby league team players
Great Britain national rugby league team players
Lance Todd Trophy winners
Rugby league fullbacks
Rugby league centres
Rugby league players from St Helens, Merseyside
Rugby league wingers
St Helens R.F.C. captains
St Helens R.F.C. coaches
St Helens R.F.C. players